

Champions

Major League Baseball
World Series: New York Yankees over Philadelphia Phillies (4-0)
All-Star Game, July 11 at Comiskey Park: National League, 4-3 (14 innings)

Other champions
All-American Girls Professional Baseball League: Rockford Peaches
Amateur World Series: Cuba
College World Series: Texas
First Japan Series: Mainichi Orions over Shochiku Robins (4-2)
Little League World Series: North Austin Lions, Austin, Texas
Negro League Baseball All-Star Game: West, 5-3
Winter Leagues
1950 Caribbean Series: Carta Vieja Yankees
Cuban League: Alacranes del Almendares
Mexican Pacific League: Tacuarineros de Culiacán
Panamanian League: Carta Vieja Yankees
Puerto Rican League: Criollos de Caguas
Venezuelan League: Navegantes del Magallanes

Awards and honors
MLB Most Valuable Player Award
 AL Phil Rizzuto, New York Yankees, SS
 NL Jim Konstanty, Philadelphia Phillies, P
MLB Rookie of the Year Award
Walt Dropo, Boston Red Sox, 1B
Sam Jethroe, Boston Braves, OF
The Sporting News Player of the Year Award
Phil Rizzuto New York Yankees
The Sporting News Manager of the Year Award
Red Rolfe Detroit Tigers

MLB statistical leaders

Major league baseball final standings

American League final standings

National League final standings

Events

February
February 10 – The Cincinnati Reds sell pitcher Johnny Vander Meer to the Chicago Cubs for an undisclosed amount of cash. In ‚ Vander Meer became the first pitcher in major league history to pitch two consecutive no-hitters, displaying his mastery over the Boston Braves (June 11) and the Brooklyn Dodgers (June 15), setting a record that still stands today.
February 17 - The Cleveland Indians release pitcher Satchel Paige. 
February 27 – In a tie-breaking game, Carta Vieja pitcher Chet Brewer defeated Puerto Rico's Caguas, 9–3, to give Panama the champion title in the 1950 Caribbean Series. Panama's third baseman Joe Tuminelli, who hit two home runs and drove in six runs, was named Most Valuable Player.
")

April
April 11 – The Texas League Opening Day between the Dallas Eagles and Tulsa Oilers is staged at the Cotton Bowl. Hall of Fame members Frank Baker‚ Ty Cobb‚ Mickey Cochrane‚ Dizzy Dean‚ Charlie Gehringer, Travis Jackson and Tris Speaker are featured. The regular Dallas Eagles team takes to the field after Dean throws out the first pitch. 53‚578 fans‚ by then the largest paid crowd in minor-league history‚ enthusiastically enjoy the exhibition.
April 18:
President Harry Truman throws out two balls at the Washington Senators' opener at Griffith Stadium – one left-handed and the other right-handed.
Billy Martin, later to become one of baseball's most controversial figures as a player and eventual manager, makes his major league debut, getting hits in both of his at bats, and scoring a run for the New York Yankees in a 15–10 win over the Boston Red Sox at Fenway Park.
 Vin Scully makes his debut as a broadcaster for the Brooklyn Dodgers, calling two innings of the team's 9–1 loss to the Philadelphia Phillies at Shibe Park. As of 2016, Scully retired from broadcasting after a 66 year tenure, the longest for any baseball broadcaster.
At the Polo Grounds‚ Sam Jethroe goes 2-for-4‚ including a home run to lead the Boston Braves to an 11–4 beating of the New York Giants. Warren Spahn is the winning pitcher.
The first night Opening Day game in major league history is played at Sportsman's Park in St. Louis, with the Cardinals defeating the Pirates 4–2‚ behind the six-hit pitching of Gerry Staley. Stan Musial and Red Schoendienst contribute with a home run each for the winners.
("-->")

May
May 6 – The Boston Braves hit five home runs in a 15–11 trouncing of the Cincinnati Reds. This gives the Braves a National League record of 13 home runs in three consecutive games‚ breaking the mark of 12 set by the New York Giants on July 1‚ 2‚ 3‚ . Grady Hatton and Ron Northey hit consecutive homers for the Reds in a lost cause.
May 9 – Ralph Kiner of the Pittsburgh Pirates hits his second grand slam in three days -and the 8th of his career-, and adds a three-run homer to drives in seven runs as the Pirates beat the Brooklyn Dodgers, 10–5.
May 11 - After a misplay of a ball in the outfield, Red Sox fans boo Ted Williams. Williams reacts to the fans by giving the fans in the outfield section an obscene gesture (Williams make the gesture three times, once to the fans in right field, next, fans in center field, and finally the fans in left). The boos continue when Williams comes to bat, driving Williams to leave the batters box and spit on a group of fans nearby that were booing him. 
May 12 - One day after his emotional outburst, Ted Williams issues an apology to Red Sox fans.

June
June 14 - Mickey Vernon is traded by the Cleveland Indians to the Washington Senators for pitcher Dick Weik. 
June 20 – Willie Mays is signed by the New York Giants as an amateur free agent. He makes his minor league debut with the Trenton Giants on June 24 at Municipal Stadium in Hagerstown, Maryland against the Hagerstown Braves.
June 24 – The Philadelphia Phillies top the Chicago Cubs, 5–4, on a pair of two-run home runs by SS Granny Hamner and C Andy Seminick. The energetic Whiz Kids now trail the Brooklyn Dodgers by a game.

July
July 1 – The first-place Philadelphia Phillies defeat the Brooklyn Dodgers, 6–4, behind unbeaten rookie pitcher 
July 2 – Cleveland Indians great Bob Feller wins his 200th major league game, 5–3, over the Detroit Tigers.
July 8 – At Forbes Field, pinch-hitter Jack Phillips hit a grand slam in the bottom of the ninth inning to give the Pittsburgh Pirates a 7–6 victory over the St. Louis Cardinals. Phillips hit his shot off Harry Brecheen, to become the first pinch-hitter to belt a walk-off grand slam in major league history. Ralph Kiner and Stan Rojek also homered for the Pirates, while Cliff Chambers was the winning pitcher. Red Schoendienst of the Cardinals went 5-for-5 in a lost cause.
July 11 – Ted Williams fractures his left elbow in the All–Star Game at Chicago's Comiskey Park.
July 19 - The New York Yankees purchase the contracts of pitcher Frank Barnes from the Kansas City Monarchs. The Yankees also purchased another contract from Kansas City, that of catcher Elston Howard.

August
August 6 – At Comiskey Park, Boston Red Sox pitcher Ellis Kinder hits a grand slam off Chicago White Sox ace Billy Pierce. Kinder collects six RBI, and his slam comes after an intentional walk to Birdie Tebbetts. Kinder also stops White Sox rookie Chico Carrasquel, who sees his hitting streak stopped  at 24 games. In the night cap, pitcher Joe Dobson allows seven hits and the Red Sox win‚ 4–3‚ to sweep Chicago.
August 11 – At Braves Field, Vern Bickford of the Boston Braves pitches a 7–0 no-hitter over the Brooklyn Dodgers.
August 13 – At Shibe Park, the New York Giants earn a split in their four-games series with the National League leaders Philadelphia Phillies.
August 31 – Gil Hodges of the Brooklyn Dodgers becomes the sixth Major Leaguer to belt four home runs in a single game. Hodges hits home runs off of four different Boston Braves pitchers and finishes the game with nine runs batted in. Brooklyn trounces Boston, 19–3.

September
September 30 – The Brooklyn Dodgers pull within one game of the National League lead, winning 7–3 over the Philadelphia Phillies in the first of a two-games series at Ebbets Field. Duke Snider and Roy Campanella hit home runs for the Dodgers, as Erv Palica (13-8) is the winning pitcher. Bob Miller (11-6) is the loser.

October
October 1
At Ebbets Field, the Philadelphia Phillies clinch the National League pennant on a 10th inning, three-run home run by LF Dick Sisler against Don Newcombe, in a dramatic 4–1 victory over the Brooklyn Dodgers on the season's last day. An inside-the-park home run by Pee Wee Reese would account for the only Dodgers run in the game. Robin Roberts, making his third start in five days, earns his 20th victory of the season.
At Comiskey Park, Gus Zernial of the Chicago White Sox becomes the first player to hit three home runs in his team's final game of a regular season, doing so in the White Sox' 10-6 loss in the second game of a doubleheader against the St. Louis Browns.
October 7 – The New York Yankees defeat the Philadelphia Phillies, 5–2, in Game 4 of the World Series to win undefeated their thirteenth World Championship.

November
November 26 – The Gillette Safety Razor Co. signs a six-year deal, worth an estimated $6 million, with Major League Baseball for the television and radio rights for the World Series.
November 27 – The Boston Red Sox sign veteran shortstop Lou Boudreau to a two-year contract worth an estimated $150,000. Boudreau, a player-manager for the Cleveland Indians, had asked Cleveland to give him his unconditional release after 13 years with the club.
November 28  – Having already relieved general manager Branch Rickey of his duties, Brooklyn Dodgers owner Walter O'Malley continues his house cleaning as names PCL Oakland manager Chuck Dressen to replace Burt Shotton, who compiled a 326-215 record from 1947 to 1950 as the Dodgers skipper.

December
December 5 – Mel Ott hires on for two years in the Oakland Oaks managerial spot vacated by Chuck Dressen.

Movies
Kill the Umpire
The Jackie Robinson Story

Births

January
January   3 – Bart Johnson
January   6 – Roy Staiger
January   7 – Ross Grimsley
January 12 – Randy Jones
January 13 – Bob Forsch
January 13 – Mike Tyson
January 18 – Marvin Lane
January 18 – Bill Sharp
January 19 – Jon Matlack
January 24 – Ron Dunn
January 26 – Mike Pazik
January 28 – Larvell Blanks
January 29 – John Fuller
January 31 – Bob Apodaca

February
February   1 – Don Castle
February   2 – Dale Murray
February   4 – Max León
February   7 – Burt Hooton
February 15 – Rick Auerbach
February 15 – Larry Yount
February 18 – Bruce Kison
February 26 – Jack Brohamer

March
March   2 – Pete Broberg
March   5 – Doug Bird
March   7 – J. R. Richard
March   9 – Doug Ault
March   9 – Wendell Kim
March 14 – Dave McKay
March 27 – Vic Harris
March 27 – Lynn McGlothen
March 30 – Grady Little

April
April   2 – Milt Ramírez
April 10 – Ken Griffey
April 15 – Dick Sharon
April 17 – Pedro García
April 20  – Willie Prall
April 20 – Milt Wilcox
April 21 – Greg Harts
April 25 – Bill Greif
April 26 – Tom Norton
April 28 – Jorge Roque
April 29 – Bob Kaiser

May
May 1 – Rich Troedson
May 4 – Butch Alberts
May 4 – Jack Baker
May 8 – Lloyd Allen 
May 11 – Dane Iorg
May 12 – Pat Darcy
May 13 – Juan Beníquez
May 13 – Bobby Valentine
May 18 – Osamu Higashio
May 21 – Bob Molinaro
May 21 – Hank Webb
May 25 – Glenn Borgmann
May 25 – John Montefusco
May 28 – Jim Cox
May 31 – Tippy Martinez

June
June   3 – Jim Dwyer
June   7 – Richie Moloney
June 10 – Elías Sosa
June 13 – Bob Strampe
June 14 – Bill Fahey
June 19 – Rudy Arroyo
June 19 – Fernando González
June 19 – Duane Kuiper
June 19 – Jim Slaton
June 21 – Mike Beard
June 26 – Dave Rosello
June 28 – Chris Speier

July
July   3 – Rob Ellis
July   5 – Gary Matthews
July 21 – Mike Cubbage
July 23 – Joe Goddard

August
August   1 – Milt May
August   1 – Wayne Tyrone
August   7 – Mike Poepping
August   9 – Junior Kennedy
August 13 – Rusty Gerhardt
August 14 – Jim Mason
August 15 – Tom Kelly
August 17 – Larry Johnson
August 17 – Dave Lemanczyk
August 19 – Mike Phillips
August 22 – Ray Burris
August 25 – Dave Heaverlo
August 25 – Stan Perzanowski
August 28 – Ron Guidry
August 29 – Doug DeCinces
August 29 – George Zeber
August 30 – Dave Chalk
August 30 – Mike McQueen
August 30 – Andy Merchant

September
September   2 – Lamar Johnson
September   4 – Doyle Alexander
September   4 – Frank White
September 15 – Dave Hilton
September 19 – Buddy Schultz
September 26 – Bill Moran
September 29 – Jim Crawford
September 29 – Ken Macha

October
October   4 – Ed Halicki
October   9 – Brian Downing
October 10 – Terry Enyart
October 13 – Dick Pole
October 16 – Jeff Terpko
October 16 – Hugh Yancy
October 24 – Rawly Eastwick
October 26 – Dave Coleman
October 26 – Wayne Garland

November
November   1 – Clint Compton
November   7 – Willie Norwood
November 12 – Bruce Bochte
November 22 – Lyman Bostock
November 22 – Greg Luzinski
November 24 – John Balaz
November 24 – George Throop
November 26 – Jorge Orta
November 27 – Bob Sheldon
November 28 – Jim Fuller
November 29 – Mike Easler
November 29 – Otto Vélez
November 30 – Craig Swan

December
December   2 – Bob Kammeyer
December   6 – Tim Foli
December   7 – Rich Coggins
December 12 – Gorman Thomas
December 15 – Chuck Hockenbery
December 15 – Mike Proly
December 21 – Jim Wright
December 22 – Tom Makowski
December 22 – Tommy Sandt
December 25 – Manny Trillo
December 26 – Mario Mendoza
December 26 – Mike Willis
December 28 – Steve Lawson

Deaths

January
January   8 – Helene Robison Britton, 70, first woman to own a major league team when she inherited the St. Louis Cardinals from her uncle in 1911; sold Redbirds in 1917 to a local consortium that included Sam Breadon and Branch Rickey.
January 14 – Bill Thomas, 72, outfielder for the 1902 Philadelphia Phillies.
January 16 – Rudy Hulswitt, 72, shortstop who played for the Louisville Colonels, Philadelphia Phillies, Cincinnati Reds and St. Louis Cardinals in parts of seven seasons spanning 1899–1910.
January 17 – Jewel Ens, 60, backup infielder for the Pittsburgh Pirates from 1922 to 1925, who later managed (1929–1931) and served as a coach (1926–1929 and 1935–1939) for them; member of the 1925 World Series champions and 1927 National League champs; also coached for Detroit Tigers, Cincinnati Reds and Boston Braves; manager of Syracuse Chiefs of the International League from 1942 until his death.
January 17 – Roy Sanders, 57, pitcher who played from 1917 to 1918 for the Cincinnati Reds and Pittsburgh Pirates. 
January 26 – Chick Autry, 46, backup catcher who played for the New York Yankees, Cleveland Indians and Chicago White Sox in part of six seasons spanning 1924–1930.
January 26 – Tom Bannon, 80, backup first baseman and outfielder for the New York Giants in their 1895 and 1896 seasons.
January 29 – Monroe Sweeney, 57, umpire who officiated in the National League between the 1924 and 1926 seasons.

February
February   2 – John Butler, 70, backup catcher who played with the Milwaukee Brewers, St. Louis Cardinals and Brooklyn Superbas in four seasons from 1901–1907, and later coached for the Chicago White Sox.
February   3 – Dick Spalding, 56, outfielder for the Philadelphia Phillies in the 1927 season and the Washington Senators in 1928, who previously played the first two games in the history of the U.S. national soccer team and also competed in professional soccer for nearly fifteen years.
February   5 – Ralph Shafer, 55, who appeared as a pinch-runner in one game for the Pittsburgh Pirates in the 1914 season.
February   6 – Art Fletcher, 65, a player, coach and manager who participated in fourteen World Series––four as a smooth fielding shortstop for the New York Giants and ten as a base coach with the New York Yankees––earning nine series rings with the Yankees; led the National League for the most assists in 1915 and from 1917 to 1919; manager of the Philadelphia Phillies from 1923–1926 and acting skipper of the Yankees in September 1929.
February 10 – Charlie Roy, 65, pitcher for the 1906 Philadelphia Phillies.
February 11 – Kiki Cuyler, 51, Hall of Fame outfielder with a strong throwing arm as well as a solid line-drive hitter in an 18-year career from 1921–1938, who collected a .321 batting average with 2,299 hits and led the Major Leagues in stolen bases four times being a member of the National League pennant-winning Pittsburgh Pirates and Chicago Cubs clubs, while leaving a definitive legacy when he hit a two-run, two-out double off Washington Senators pitcher Walter Johnson in the eighth inning of Game 7 of the 1925 World Series for a 9–7 lead, clinching the series title for the Pirates; coach for Cubs (1941–1943) and Boston Red Sox (1949 until his death).
February 11 – Hank Griffin, 63, pitcher who played from 1911 to 1912 for the Chicago Cubs and Boston Braves.
February 11 – Paul Meloan, 61, right fielder who played with the Chicago White Sox and St. Louis Browns between 1910 and 1911.
February 17 – Jack Dalton, 64, outfielder who became one of only a few players to see action in three different Major Leagues, while playing with the Brooklyn Superbas and Dodgers of the National League, as well as for the Buffalo Blues of the outlaw Federal League and the Detroit Tigers of the American League in part of four seasons spanning 1910–1916.

March
March   5 – Effie Norton, 76,  pitcher who played from 1896 to 1897 for the Washington Senators of the National League.
March   7 – Joe Brown, 49, pitcher who played for the Chicago White Sox in 1927. 
March 11 – William Gallagher, 76, shortstop and catcher who played for the Philadelphia Phillies in 1896.
March 13 – George Young, 60, pinch-hitter who played in two games for the Cleveland Naps in 1913.
March 16 – Nubs Kleinke, 38, pitcher for the St. Louis Cardinals in part of two seasons from 1936–1938.
March 22 – Slim Sallee, 65, pitcher who posted a lifetime mark of 174-143 and a 2.56 ERA for the St. Louis Cardinals, Cincinnati Reds and New York Giants in span of 14 seasons from 1908 through 1921, helping Cincinnati clinch the 1919 World Series and the Giants win the National League pennant in 1917.	
March 24 – Bert Lewis, 54, pitcher for the 1924 Philadelphia Phillies.
March 25 – Pussy Tebeau, 80, outfielder who played briefly for the Cleveland Spiders during the 1895 season.
March 27 – Fred Frank, 77, outfielder for the 1898 Cleveland Spiders.
March 28 – Henry Clarke, 74, pitcher for the Cleveland Spiders in 1897 and the Chicago Orphans in 1898, who also coached at college for the Michigan Wolverines baseball team, and later served as a Nebraska state legislator and railroad commissioner.
March 28 – Ernie Ross, 69, Canadian pitcher who appeared in two games with the original Baltimore Orioles of the American League in their 1902 season.

April
April   2 – Doc Sechrist, 74, pitcher who played for the New York Giants in its 1899 season
April   9 – John McDonald, 67, pitcher for the 1907 Washington Senators.
April 11 – Dick McCabe, 54, who pitched for the Boston Red Sox in the 1918 season and the Chicago White Sox in 1922.
April 19 – Dusty Miller, 73, outfielder for the 1902 Chicago Orphans of the National League.
April 22 – Dave Pickett, 75, outfielder who played for the Boston Beaneaters in 1898.
April 23 – Bill Hallman, 74, outfielder who played with the Milwaukee Brewers and Chicago White Sox in part of four seasons between 1901 and 1907. 
April 23 – Dike Varney, 69, pitcher for the 1902 Cleveland Bronchos of the American League.
April 25 – Offa Neal, 73, third baseman who appeared in four games with the New York Giants in 1905, and also spent 12 seasons in the Minor Leagues as a player, coach or manager.
April 30 - Tom Niland, 80, outfielder for the 1896 St. Louis Browns of the National League.

May
May   2 – Jo-Jo Morrissey, 46, infielder who played for the Cincinnati Reds and the Chicago White Sox in part of three seasons between 1932 and 1936.
May   3 – Jim Galloway, 62, second baseman who played for the St. Louis Cardinals in 1912 and served in World War I, then returned to baseball in 1920 to play ten more seasons, retiring in 1929 at the age 41.
May   4 – Vince Molyneaux, 61, pitcher who played from 1917 to 1918 for the St. Louis Browns and Boston Red Sox.
May   9 – Art Watson, 66, catcher who played from 1914 to 1915 for the Brooklyn Tip-Tops and Buffalo Blues clubs of the outlaw Federal League.
May 19 – Wattie Holm, 48, fourth outfielder who played with the St. Louis Cardinals in a span of seven seasons from 1924–1932, as well for the 1926 World Champion Cardinals.
May 23 – Ernie Groth, 65, pitcher for the 1904 Chicago Cubs.

June
June   4 – Dan Griner, 62, pitcher who played for the St. Louis Cardinals and Brooklyn Robins in all or part of seven seasons spanning 1912–1916. 
June   4 – Dean Sturgis, 57, backup catcher for the Philadelphia Athletics during the 1914 season.
June   6 – Walt Thomas, 66, shortstop who appeared in six games for the 1908 Boston Doves of the National League.
June   8 – Ledell Titcomb, 83, pitcher who played with four teams in the National League and American Association in four seasons from 1886–1890, sporting a record of 30-28 with a 3.47 ERA in 63 games, while pitching a no-hitter against the Syracuse Stars in 1890.
June 28 – Mutz Ens, 65, first baseman who played for the Chicago White Sox in its 1912 season.
June 30 – Paul Fitzke, 49, pitcher for the Cleveland Indians in 1924, who also played in the National Football League for the Frankford Yellow Jackets in 1925.
June 30 – Joe Lake, 69, pitcher who played from 1908 through 1913 for the New York Highlanders, St. Louis Browns and Chicago Cubs.

July
July   2 – Joe Gormley, 83, pitcher for the Philadelphia Phillies during the 1891 National League season.
July   3 – Ed Donalds, 67, pitcher who played briefly for the Cincinnati Reds in 1912.
July   5 – Joe Sargent, 56, middle infielder and third baseman who appeared in 66 games with the Detroit Tigers in 1921.
July 10 – John L. Smith, 61, pharmaceutical executive (Pfizer) who had been a co-owner and one of four equal partners in the Brooklyn Dodgers since 1945.
July 15 – Biddy Dolan, 69, first baseman who played in 1914 for the Indianapolis Hoosiers of the Federal League.
July 17 – Fred Blanding, 62, pitcher who posted a record of 46-46 with a 3.13 ERA for the Cleveland Naps in five seasons from 1910 to 1914.
July 18 – Art LaVigne, 65, catcher who played for the Buffalo Buffeds of the Federal League in its 1914 season.
July 23 – Bill Lange, 79, center fielder who played his entire seven-year career for the Chicago Colts and Orphans of the National League from 1893 through 1899, collecting a .330 batting average with 400 stolen bases in 813 games and ranking in several season categories, including average, home runs, RBI, runs scored and stolen bases, while leading the league with 73 steals in 1897.

August
August   4 – John Burke, 73, pitcher for the 1902 New York Giants.
August   4 – Harry Coveleski, 64, left-handed pitcher for the Philadelphia Phillies, Cincinnati Reds and Detroit Tigers over nine seasons from 1907–1918, a three-time 20-game winner who is best remembered for his rookie season with the Phillies in 1908, when he defeated the powerful New York Giants three times in a span of five days at the end of the season, to deny John McGraw's squad the 1908 National League pennant, which forced a replay of the infamous Merkle's Boner game.
August   9 – Ed Klepfer, 62, spitball pitcher who played for the New York Yankees, Chicago White Sox and Cleveland Indians in a span of six seasons between 1911 and 1919.
August 10 – Leo Kavanagh, 56, shortstop who played for the Chicago Whales of the outlaw Federal League in its 1914 season.
August 11 – Frank Smykal, 60, shortstop for the 1916 Pittsburgh Pirates.
August 17 – Pit Gilman, 86, backup outfielder who played with the Cleveland Blues in its 1884 season.
August 17 – Paddy O'Connor, 71, Irish catcher who played for the Pittsburgh Pirates, St. Louis Cardinals, Pittsburgh Rebels and New York Yankees over six seasons spanning 1908–1918.
August 20 – Ed Zmich, 65, pitcher who played with the St. Louis Cardinals from 1910 to 1911.
August 25 – George Disch, 71, pitcher for the 1905 Detroit Tigers.
August 29 – Doc Ralston, 65, fourth outfielder for the Washington Senators in their 1910 season.

September
September   1 – Frank Pearce, 45, pitcher who played from 1933 through for the Philadelphia Phillies.
September   3 – Jim Connor, 87, second baseman for the Chicago Colts and Orphans clubs of the National League in part of three seasons spanning 1892–1899, who also spent six years in the Minor Leagues, including a stint as player/manager for the Newburgh Hillies of the Hudson River League in its 1907 season.
September 14 – Billy Ging, 77, pitcher for the 1889 Boston Beaneaters of the National League.
September 15 – Joe Knotts, 66. backup catcher who played in 1907 with the Boston Doves of the National League. 
September 17 – Jerry Hurley, 87, catcher who played for the Boston Beaneaters in the National League in 1889, the Pittsburgh Burghers in the Players' League in 1890, and the Cincinnati Kelly's Killers of the American Association in 1891. 
September 21 – Duke Kenworthy, 64, second baseman who spent four seasons in the Major Leagues, including stints in the American League with the Washington Senators in 1912 and the St. Louis Browns in 1917. and for the Kansas City Packers of the short-lived Federal League from 1914 to 1915.
September 23 – Sam Barry, 57, collegiate athletic coach who achieved significant accomplishments in three major sports, as well as one of the principal forces behind the creation of the College World Series, which his team won in 1948.
September 25 – Pep Deininger, 72, German pitcher and center fielder who played for the Boston Americans and Philadelphia Phillies in part of three seasons spanning 1902–1909.
September 26 – John Scheneberg, 62, who pitched with the Pittsburgh Pirates in the 1913 season and for the St. Louis Browns in 1920.
September 28 – George Paynter, 79, outfielder who played in 1894 for the St. Louis Browns of the National League.
September 30 – Ned Crompton, 61, English outfielder who played with the St. Louis Browns of the American League during the 1909 season, and later appeared in one game for the Cincinnati Reds of the National League in 1910.
September 30 – Jack Harper, who pitched for five teams in an eight-year career between 1889 and 1906, sporting an 80–64 record and 3.55 ERA in 158 games, including two 23-win seasons with the St. Louis Cardinals in 1901 and the Cincinnati Reds in 1904.

October
October   1 – Red Howell, 41, pinch hitter for 1941 Cleveland Indians, reaching base six times in 11 plate appearances (four walks and two singles); in his 17-year minor-league career (1928–1944) as an outfielder, he collected 2,509 hits and 229 homers in 2,121 career games, batting .326.
October 14 – Jocko Fields, 50, outfielder who played from 1887 through 1891 for the Pittsburgh Alleghenys, Burghers and Pirates teams, as well as for the Philadelphia Phillies in 1891 and the New York Giants in 1892. 
October 17 – Tom Tuckey, 66, pitcher who played for the Boston Doves in the 1908 and 1909 seasons.
October 19 – Lefty Gervais, 60, pitcher for the 1913 Boston Braves.

November
November   4 – Grover Cleveland Alexander, 63, Hall of Fame pitcher who played for the Philadelphia Phillies, Chicago Cubs, St. Louis Cardinals and Philadelphia Phillies in a span of 20 seasons from 1911 through 1930, winning three Triple Crowns (1915–1916; 1920) and setting a modern record for a rookie with 28 wins (1911), while collecting three seasons with 30-plus wins and leading the National League in wins (six times), strikeouts (six), earned run average (four) and shutouts (six), being also instrumental in leading the Phillies to their first pennant in 1915 and the Cardinals to the 1926 World Series Championship striking out Tony Lazzeri with the bases loaded in decisive Game 7 at Yankee Stadium.
November   5 – Bill Johnson, 58, outfielder for the 1916 Philadelphia Athletics.
November   6 – Martin Glendon, 71, pitcher who played from 1902 to 1903 with the Cincinnati Reds and the Cleveland Naps.
November 14 – Jack McAleese, 72, pitcher who appeared in just one game with the Chicago White Stockings in the 1901 season.
November 16 – Frank Hemphill, 72, outfielder who played for the Chicago White Sox in the 1906 season and the Washington Senators in 1909.

December
December   1 – Bob Hall, 71, who played some outfield and infield utility positions with the Philadelphia Phillies, New York Giants and Brooklyn Superbas between 1904 and 1905.
December   5 – Bill Dahlen, 80, one of the finest shortstops between 1891 and 1911 as well as a reliable hitter and aggressive baserunner, whose leadership helped the 1905 New York Giants win the World Series title, ending his career with 2,461 hits and 548 stolen bases, and having played more games than any player in Major League history, with 2,444.
December   6 – Jing Johnson, 56, pitcher who played for the Philadelphia Athletics in all or part of five seasons spanning 1916–1928.
December   9 – Mickey Corcoran, 68, second baseman who appeared in 14 games for the 1910 Cincinnati Reds; prolific minor-league base-stealer who swiped 384 bags in 1,875 games played.
December 19 – Wingo Anderson, 64, pitcher for the Cincinnati Reds in its 1910 season.
December 20 – Carroll Yerkes, 47, who pitched for the Philadelphia Athletics and Chicago Cubs over the course of five seasons between 1927 and 1933.
December 21 – Dad Lytle, 88, second baseman and outfielder who split time with the Chicago Colts and the Pittsburgh Alleghenys during their 1890 season.
December 22 – Rip Egan, 79, pitcher who appeared in one game with the Washington Senators of the National League in 1894, and later managed in the Minor Leagues and worked as an umpire in the American League from 1907 to 1914.
December 22 – Cal Vasbinder, 70, pitcher who played in 1902 for the Cleveland Bronchos of the American League.

Sources

External links

Baseball Reference – 1950 MLB Season Summary

Baseball Reference – MLB Players born in 1950
Baseball Reference – MLB Players died in 1950